Captain Johan Kock (4 June 1861 – 13 April 1915) was a Finnish soldier who had been decommissioned from the Finnish army in Viipuri in 1897. Kock was a revolutionary who was the leader of the Finnish Labour Corps from 1905 to 1906.

Biography
Kock was born in Helsinki. In 1900 Kock was a reporter in Viipuri. He organised routes to smuggle revolutionary writings from Sweden via Finland to Russia. In 1905 during the general strike the academic society and labor protested together against the Russian czar. Kock became the leader of the national guard during the strike. Kock gained the support and trust of the general governor Ivan Obolensky. Nevertheless, Obolensky negotiated with the Constitutionals how to solve the strike by political means. The Academic society couldn't accept Kock's leadership: university students and polytechniques split off, founding their own organisation under the leadership of Gösta Thörsleff.  

The Constitutionals wanted to end the strike on 5 November, but the  Labour Corps  to continue. Kock, who supported the strike, attended the negotiations to end the strike. The strike ended on 6 November, and on the next day Kock pulled his troops from the Helsinki police stations.
 
Kock took part in the Sveaborg Rebellion in 1906 in the Sveaborg fortress (renamed "Suomenlinna" in Finnish in 1918). When the rebellion failed, Kock fled the country among with other activists to Sweden and from there to the United Kingdom  before moving to the United States. He died in 1915 in Fitchburg, Massachusetts. Matti Kurikka delivered the eulogy at Kock's funeral shortly before his own death.

References

External links
 
 

1861 births
1915 deaths
Military personnel from Helsinki
Finnish emigrants to the United States (1809–1917)
Raivaaja editors